Luigi Rana (born 6 November 1986) is an Italian footballer who plays for Martina.

Biography
Rana was a youth product of A.S. Bari. He attended some pre-season training and received no.30 shirt in summer 2010 and no.97 in 2011 Rana received shirt number as he once treated as a member of the first team, until left on loan in January 2011. However, in 2011–12 season, only those excluded from the coach plan were received 90s number, which Rana only played twice. In July 2012 he left for Vigor Lamezia in temporary deal. In January 2013 Rana joined Martina outright along with Nicola Petrilli.

References

External links
 
 Luigi Rana at aic.football.it 

1986 births
Living people
Italian footballers
A.S.D. Gallipoli Football 1909 players
Manfredonia Calcio players
A.S. Melfi players
Valenzana Mado players
S.S.C. Bari players
Serie A players
A.S. Noicattaro Calcio players
Association football forwards